Armillaria omnituens is a species of mushroom in the family Physalacriaceae. This species is found in Asia.

See also
 List of Armillaria species

References

omnituens
Fungal tree pathogens and diseases
Fungi described in 1850
Fungi of Asia
Taxa named by Miles Joseph Berkeley